The Nizhyn Regiment or Nezhin Regiment was one of ten territorial-administrative subdivisions of the Cossack Hetmanate. The regiment's capital was the city of Nizhyn, now in Chernihiv Oblast of central Ukraine. Other major cities of the regiment were Hlukhiv and Baturyn.

The Nizhyn Regiment was founded in 1648, in 1653 it annexed the territory of the Novhorod-Siverskyi Regiment. Around that time the Regiment consisted of 10 sotnias. In 1654 add several hundred sotnia from the Chernihiv Regiment. Baturyn, and Hlukhiv the former capitals of the Hetmanate were part of the regiment.

On the territories of the regiment were 1 city, 3 towns, and 866 villages. In 1782 the regiment was disbanded by the order of the Empress Catherine the Great. All of the regiment's territories were included into the Chernigov Governorate.

History 
1648 - creation of the regiment. Originally consisted of 10 hundreds.

1653 - the Novgorod regiment withdrew from this regiment for a short time.

1654 - several hundred Chernigov regiments, all hundreds of the liquidated Novgorod regiment and the former Starodub district of Smolensk voivodeship were added to the Nizhyn regiment.

The Cossacks of the Nizhyn Regiment took part in the uprisings of 1657-1658 under the leadership of Martin Pushkar, and in 1658 under the leadership of Ivan Bezpaly.

1663 - 10 hundred joined the Starodub Regiment.

The regiment took part in the Crimean campaigns of 1687 and 1689, the Azov campaigns of 1695-1696, and the Northern War of 1700-1721.

According to the register of 1723, the Nizhyn Regiment consisted of 19 hundreds, which included 6,527 cavalry and 3,379 infantry Cossacks. The majority of the population were feudally dependent common peasants and assistants.

1752 - Olyshivska Hundred and Mrynska Hundred became part of the Kiev Regiment.

1782 - the regiment is liquidated. The territory became part of the Chernigov and Novgorod-Siversky governorates. At that time the Nizhyn regiment consisted of 22 hundred. The regiment had 1 city, 3 towns and 866 villages.

Throughout its historical existence, the regiment housed two hetman's capitals of the Cossack Hetmanate: Baturin and Gluchov.

Nizhyn Regiment of the period of B. Khmelnytsky's hetmanship 
In the summer of 1648, the Nizhyn Cossack Regiment was formed in the liberated Nizhyn, which in the autumn of the same year numbered about 10,000 Cossacks. The newly formed regiment bordered on the Chernihiv, Pereyaslav and Pryluky regiments. The territory of the Nizhyn Regiment occupied the left bank of the Desna River, starting from the town of Divytsia and ending with the delta of the Izota River. Its lands also stretched along both banks of the Sejm River, from the delta to the confluence of the Kleven River, and one of the tributaries of the Desna, the Oster River, from the town of Mryn to the source of this river.

The first known colonel of the Nizhyn Regiment of the Khmelnytsky period was Prokopiy Shumeiko. In the summer of 1648, under his leadership, the Nizhyn Cossacks marched on the Polish fortress of Kodak.

Approaching Kodak, the Cossacks laid siege to it. The Cossacks could not capture the fortress with its strong defensive lines and the presence of a Polish garrison under the command of foreign officers. Only at the end of September 1648, due to lack of food and disease, which ruthlessly mowed the besieged, the Poles went to negotiations and capitulated.

The following year, 1649, part of the Cossacks of the Nizhyn Regiment opposed the Lithuanian army of Janusz Radziwill on the northern border of the Hetmanate. The successful actions of the Cossacks in this region did not allow the Lithuanians to provide significant assistance to the army of John II Casimir and contributed to the victory of B. Khmelnytsky in the military campaign of 1649.

In August 1649, due to the betrayal of the Tatars, B. Khmelnytsky was forced to conclude the Peace of Zboriv with the Polish-Lithuanian Commonwealth. This register also included the Nizhyn Regiment led by Nizhyn Colonel Prokopiy Shumeyko. It is still not possible to determine the exact number of Cossacks who were registered in the Nizhyn Regiment. According to the father of Ukrainian history M. Hrushevsky, in the register of 1649 in the regiment:

"Hundreds of all are recorded 11, but the last two are connected together, so in reality there are 10. Of these, 6 are Nizhyn, without any close surnames, and the seventh is probably also Nizhyn, named after his captain G. Kobyletsky. In addition, hundreds of Divotska, Berezovska, and hundreds of Nosivska and Kobyzka are connected together. Five hundred have a round of 100, the others a little less (95-99), Nosivsko-Kobyzchanska together 99… This is the smallest of the regiments: a total of 991 souls are inscribed in it."

"Chronicle of Colonel Hryhoriy Hrabyanka of Hadiach" mentions 983 Cossacks, and "History of Rus" - about 1200 people.

At the beginning of 1651, King of the Commonwealth Jan II Casimir violated the terms of the Peace of Zboriv by invading the territory of the Hetmanate. The Cossack army led by B. Khmelnytsky went to meet him. While the hetman opposed the Poles near Berestechko and Bila Tserkva, the left-bank Chernihiv and Nizhyn regiments, led by Chernihiv colonel Martin Nebaba, defended the northern border of the Hetmanate from Janusz Radziwill's Lithuanian troops.

The following events are covered in detail in the Chronicle of the Seer. M. Nebaba's army, leaving a guard near the crossing of the Dnieper, encamped near Ripky. And when J. Radziwill's army began the crossing, the Cossack guard let the colonel know about it.

After the battle, the Cossack camp, food and weapons were seized by J. Radziwill's soldiers.

In 1651, under the terms of the Peace of Bila Tserkva, the Nizhyn Regiment was liquidated.

In January–February 1652, 16,000 Polish troops entered the lands of the revived Chernihiv Voivodeship. Thus, the brother of the Crown Hetman of the Commonwealth M. Kalinowski, Samuel, was stationed in Nizhyn for the winter, and "the troops who had a large army with him, spread in various cities in the Dnieper and Zadesen."

Taking advantage of the liquidation of the Nizhyn Regiment, Polish official Adam Kisiel sent Mr. Luh, the governor, to his lands in the Nizhyn region. This caused a new wave of discontent and during the skirmish in Kobyzhchy Mr. Luh was killed. Colonel L. Sukhinya of Nizhyn punished those involved in the murder, but the Cossacks, dissatisfied with this, appealed to Colonel Stepan Pobodail of Chernihiv to address their deputy as hetman. S. Pobodailo agreed and went to B. Khmelnytsky. This visit of the colonel to the hetman led to the fact that B. Khmelnytsky, having studied the situation in detail, executed a number of persons involved in illegal actions. It is quite possible that L. Sukhinya was among them, because after these events his name is no longer mentioned, and Ivan Zolotarenko was appointed the new Nizhyn colonel.

The following year, 1653, the Cossacks of the Pereyaslav, Chernihiv, and Nizhyn regiments, led by Colonel I. Zolotarenko of Nizhyn, again opposed the Lithuanian troops on the northern border of the Hetmanate. The hetman also sent some Tatar detachments to help I. Zolotarenko. There were no major battles, and the war of 1653 in the Nizhyn region was marked by only minor skirmishes, after which Lithuanian troops retreated to their previous positions.

The next significant military action with the participation of the Cossacks of the Nizhyn Regiment began in May 1654, when Russia, in accordance with the terms of the Pereyaslav Council, declared war on the Commonwealth and invaded the territory of Belarus. To help the Russians, the hetman sent the Chernihiv, Nizhyn and Pereyaslav regiments led by Colonel I. Zolotarenko of Nizhyn, who received the post of acting hetman. The total number of Cossack troops was 20 thousand people. In addition, Hetman B. Khmelnytsky, according to Hryhoriy Hrabyanka, allowed anyone who wanted to go on a campaign. Modern Nizhyn local historian Oleksandr Urivalkin provides information about the constituent parts of I. Zolotarenko's army: Nizhyn Regiment of G. Kobyletsky, Regiment of Tymofiy Zolotarenko, Chernihiv Regiment of Pobodaila, Starodub Regiment of Pasha, Borznyansky Regiment of Zabila and S. Kurbatsky, Regiment of Yu. Semenov… and V. Zolotarenko's detachment, which acted directly together with Oleksiy Mykhailovych's troops in the Smolensk region.

Nizhyn Regiment and Hetman I. Mazepa 
In 1687 a coup d'etat was carried out, during which the officer of the Nizhyn Regiment also took part. Ivan Mazepa was appointed head of the Hetmanate, which in turn only deepened the internal conflicts between the Cossacks.

Immediately after his election in 1687, Hetman I. Mazepa signed with the Russian government the Kolomatsky Articles, which determined the place and status of the Left Bank of Ukraine as part of the Moscow State. Thus, the second article of the agreement, submitted in the Chronicle of Samiil Wieliczka, directly concerns the city of Nizhyn and is entitled "On the voivode and hostages in Kiev, Pereyaslav, Chernihiv, Nizhyn, Ostra…" It was in these cities were to be Russian voivodes, who relied on pre-defined in the Ukrainian-Russian treaties functions and powers.

The initial period of the new hetman's rule was marked by an almost radical change of persons who held regimental and hundreds of positions in the Cossack regiments of the Left Bank of Ukraine. According to S. Pavlenko's calculations, during 1687-1693 the personnel potential of the Hetmanate was renewed by almost 70% [10, p.26]. These changes also affected the Nizhyn Regiment led by Stepan Zabila. The following representatives of the Cossack officers were sent to the hundreds of towns of the regiment: Hryhoriy Samoilovych to Nova Mlyny, Samiylo Afanasiev to Verkiivka, Karpo Mankivsky to Sheptaki and others.

In 1689, Ukraine was involved in the preparation of the second Crimean campaign. On April 24, 1689, 112,000 Russian riflemen and 50,000 Ukrainian Cossacks (including S. Zabila's Nizhyn Regiment) under the command of Vasyl Golitsyn and I. Mazepa again marched on the Crimean Khanate.

On August 10, 1689, the large Ukrainian embassy of I. Mazepa arrived in Moscow. It is well known that among the Ukrainian government officials accompanying the hetman was Nizhyn Colonel S. Zabila. After the beginning of 1694, his name is no longer mentioned in the historical literature. Fr. During the campaign, the Cossacks deal a devastating blow to the Budzha horde, capture the fortress of Hinkushli and release a number of prisoners. Among the captured trophies, historians mention 10 guns.

Nizhyn Regiment (1700-1709) 
In the autumn of 1700, by order of Peter I, Hetman I. Mazepa sent a corps of Cossacks to the Baltics to help the Moscow army, which had entered the war with the Kingdom of Sweden. Colonel Ivan Obidovsky of Nizhyn was appointed hetman of the Cossack troops of the Poltava, Kyiv, and Nizhyn regiments. "Mazepa, entrusting his nephew with a large Cossack unit, clearly contributed to his hardening, maturing, gaining experience in the difficult conditions of war. But regiments of 7,290 soldiers arrived in Narva late. " On November 19, the Russians suffered a crushing defeat at the hands of the Swedish army led by Charles XII.

The appearance of I. Obidovsky's corps in the Baltics, the unexpected raids of the Ukrainian Cossacks deep into the territory of the Swedes forced Charles XII to place troops in the border fortresses and to live in constant anticipation of the attack. After long meetings, the Swedish command decided to conduct a punitive expedition against the Cossack troops from Ukraine. However, General Klipsler's 4,000-strong corps approached Gdov and did not dare to storm the city, as there were many defenders in it.

Due to the failures of the war with the Swedes, relations between Mazepa and Sich also worsened. Thus, in June 1705, the hetman sent several hundred Nizhyn regiments to the Duma deacon Omelyan Ukrainets with an order to "tame those Zaporozhian dogs." Nizhyn residents arrived in Zaporizhia, but fate saved them from the shedding of fraternal blood. The fact is that Peter I decided not to anger the Cossacks in such difficult conditions and ordered to pay them a salary. After that, the Nizhyn Regiment returned home safely.

Nizhyn Regiment in the Russo-Turkish War (1768-1774) 
In 1768 a new Russo-Turkish war began. Russian armies under the command of O. Golitsyn and Peter Rumyantsev went to the Black Sea region. The Cossacks were also involved. The 2nd Army also included 6,000 Cossacks from the Chernihiv and Nizhyn Regiments under the command of P. Miloradovich, P. Rozumovsky, and Oleksandr Bezborodko. They fought near Khotyn and won.

References

External links
Encyclopedia of Ukraine

Cossack Hetmanate Regiments
History of Chernihiv Oblast
1648 establishments in the Polish–Lithuanian Commonwealth